The Aromanians in Serbia ( or ;  /  or  / ), most commonly known as "Tsintsars" ( / ) and sometimes as "Vlachs" ( / ), are a non-recognized Aromanian ethnic minority in Serbia. Historically, they were an isolated group who focused on preserved their culture, language and identity and on nomadic pastoralism. However, from the second half of the 20th century, the Serbian Aromanians would begin to put aside this practice and migrate to the cities, where they would be subject to assimilation.

Many Aromanians came to Serbia after leaving Moscopole. This city had been the economic and cultural center of the Aromanians for years, even becoming the second biggest city of the Ottoman Empire, but it was plundered and destroyed in the mid-18th century. Many former inhabitants of this city went north, reaching various European cities, including some in modern Serbia such as Belgrade, Novi Sad and Zemun. Upon arriving, the Aromanians started being called Tsintsars by the Serbs, name that they ended up adopting and the one that they insist that it be used to refer to them today.

There are an estimated 5,000, 10,000 or 15,000 Aromanians living in Serbia, despite the fact that only 243 people declared themselves ethnic "Tsintsar" (Aromanian) in the 2011 Serbian census. This is why the Aromanians have not been recognized as a national minority of Serbia yet, as the minimum number of people a minority has to have to be declared as such must be 300. The Aromanians in Serbia do not conform compact communities anywhere in the country and live scattered throughout it, living mostly in Serbian cities such as in Knjaževac, Pančevo, Smederevo and, specially, Belgrade and Niš.

Nowadays, there is a cultural organization known as the Lunjina Serbian–Aromanian Association with the aim of preserving the Aromanian minority in Serbia and its customs, culture, language, name and traditions.

See also
 Aromanians in Albania
 Aromanians in Bulgaria
 Aromanians in Greece
 Aromanians in North Macedonia
 Aromanians in Romania

References

 
Ethnic groups in Serbia